The All-Ireland Senior Softball Singles title (M Donnelly 60 x 30 Singles) is an all-Ireland Gaelic Athletic Association competition between all 32 counties of Ireland which first commenced in 1925. The first senior hardball singles title was won by M. Joyce of Dublin, a player from Urlingford, County Kilkenny. Kilkenny have won the most titles, with a total of 22.

The 2007 final will was contested by Michael 'Ducksy' Walsh of Kilkenny and Eoin Kennedy of Dublin and Saint Brigid's GAA. Eoin won the final in two straight games by winning 21-20 and 21-6 to retain his title. Eoin then went on to win it in 2008, 2009 and 2010, which means he has now won the title seven times in a row. Since then, he has won three more titles, while Robbie McCarthy of Westmeath and Mullingar Handball Club won seven titles.

Champions

Winners by County

See also
 Gaelic handball
 Gaelic Senior Hardball Singles

References

External links
Softball Roll of Honour
Official GAA Handball Website

Gaelic Athletic Association competitions
Gaelic handball